Down Sterling was the name of the  Loyola College, Chennai,'s annual cultural festival. It was held in the early 1980s, and again between 1985-1992, before being cancelled for various reasons. The college cultural fest was named after the college's well-known rock band - Down Sterling.

The Hindu reported about this event:

Down Sterling College Band
The original college band lineup (1980s) consisted of:
 Shrikanth Barathan - (Statistics) Vocals
 Grenville Jones - (Statistics) Vocals
 Sudhin Prabhakar - (Zoology) Lead guitar
 Calistus D’Costa - (B.Com.) Keyboards
 Fabian Holt - (B.Com.) Bass guitar
 Noel Peters - (B.Com.) Drums

Name Change
As of 2010 the name of the cultural event in Loyola is Ovations which is India's Biggest Intra-Collegiate event and is held at a whopping expense.

References

External links
Sterling Road : A Road With Many Facets
Loyola College Ovations 2018 Gallery
Chennai College Fight Culture
Down Sterling Digital Magazine

Culfests
Festivals in Tamil Nadu
Culture of Chennai